Hamma Bouziane is a district in Constantine Province, Algeria. It was named after its capital, Hamma Bouziane.

Municipalities
The district is further divided into 2 municipalities:
Hamma Bouziane
Didouche Mourad

Districts of Constantine Province
http://www.toutlemaghreb.com/rubriques_/Villes_du_Maghreb/hamma_bouziane.php